De Artevelde University of Applied Sciences (NL: Arteveldehogeschool) is a Catholic University of Applied Sciences in the city of Ghent, Belgium. The Artevelde University of Applied sciences offers a diverse range of bachelor-programs, bachelor-after-bachelor-programs, postgraduate-programs and schoolings.

History 
In 2000 the school was merged from 4 Catholic institutions of higher education:

 the Hogeschool voor Economisch en Grafisch Onderwijs (EGON) – a business and design college
 the Katholieke Hogeschool voor Gezondheidszorg Oost-Vlaanderen (KaHoG) – a health care college
 the Katholieke Hogeschool voor Lerarenopleiding en Bedrijfsmanagement (KLBO) – a teacher-training and management college
 the Sociale Hogeschool KVMW Gent – a college for social work
In 2003 it became an academic affiliate of the Associatie Universiteit Gent (AUGent).

Number of students 
At the time of the merger in 2000, these colleges together comprised approximately 6,700 students and nearly 800 staff, and were the third largest institution of higher education in Flanders.

On 1 January 2017, the school had more than 14,000 students and 1,300 staff members.

Campuses 
The school has 12 campuses:

 Campus Brusselsepoortstraat
 Campus Goudstraat
 Campus Hoogpoort
 Campus Kantienberg
 Campus Kattenberg
 Campus Leeuwstraat
 Campus Mariakerke
 Campus Sint-Amandsberg
 Campus Sint-Annaplein
 Campus Stropkaai
 Campus Watersportbaan
Campus Tinelstraat

References 

Education in Ghent
Colleges in Belgium
2000 establishments in Belgium